Balakrishna or Balakrishnan is Hindu surname, derived from Bala Krishna. Notable people with the surname include:

Balakrishna
 Balakrishna (Kannada actor) (1913 – 1995)
 Balakrishna Guruji, a Reiki master and hypnotherapist 
 Balakrishna Bhagwant Borkar (1910 – 1984) a poet from Goa, India
 Nandamuri Balakrishna (born 1960), Indian film actor
 Rasamayi Balakrishna (born ?), Indian singer, poet and political activist

Balakrishnan
 A. G. Balakrishnan (born ?), Indian politician
 Ajit Balakrishnan (born ?), Indian entrepreneur and business executive
 A. V. Balakrishnan (Arun V. Balakrishnan) (1922–2015), American applied mathematician and professor
 C. Balakrishnan (1918–1997), Indian plastic surgeon
 C. N. Balakrishnan (1934–2018), Indian politician
 C. V. Balakrishnan (born 1952), Indian writer
 David Balakrishnan (born 1954) American founder of the Turtle Island Quartet
 Gopal Balakrishnan (born ?), American professor and editor
 Hari Balakrishnan (born ?), American professor of engineering and computer science at MIT
 Jennifer Balakrishnan, American mathematician
 Kalpathy Balakrishnan (born ?), Indian percussionist
Kamala Rani Balakrishnan, Singaporean criminal 
 Kavitha Balakrishnan (born 1976), Indian poet, art critic, and contemporary art researcher
 K. Balakrishnan (CPI-M) (born ?), Indian communist politician
 K. Balakrishnan (Kesavan Balakrishnan) (1925–984), Indian politician, writer and editor
 K. Balakrishnan (Tamil Nadu) (born ?), Indian communist politician
 K. G. Balakrishnan (Konakuppakatil Gopinathan Balakrishnan) (born 1945), Indian Chief Justice and Chairperson of the National Human Rights Commission of India
 Kodiyeri Balakrishnan (born 1953), Indian communist politician
 Krish (singer) (Vijay balakrishnan) (born 1977), Indian playback singer
 Madhu Balakrishnan (born 1974), Indian playback singer
 N. L. Balakrishnan (born ?), Indian still photographer and actor
 P. K. Balakrishnan (1926–1991), Indian novelist, critic and historian
 Radhika Balakrishnan (born ?), American human rights advocate
 Ranjith (director) (Ranjith Balakrishnan) (born 1964), Indian film director, screenwriter, producer and actor
 R. Balki (R. Balakrishnan) (born ?), Indian advertiser, filmmaker, and director
 S. Balakrishnan (composer) (born ?), Indian film score composer and music director
 S. Balakrishnan (Modakurichi MLA) (born ?), Indian politician
 S. Balakrishnan (Mudukulathur MLA) (born ?), Indian politician
 Sheila Balakrishnan (born ?), Indian obstetrician and a gynaecologist
 S. K. Balakrishnan (1935–2001), Indian politician
 S. N. Balakrishnan, University chancellor
 V. Balakrishnan (disambiguation), several people
 Vivian Balakrishnan (born 1961), Singaporean government bureaucrat

See also
16116 Balakrishnan, a main-belt asteroid

Hindu given names
Sanskrit-language names
Indian given names
Given names
Telugu names
Telugu given names